Dyckia crassifolia is a plant species in the genus Dyckia. This species is endemic to Bolivia.

References

crassifolia
Flora of Bolivia